Lolavirus is a genus of viruses in the order Tymovirales, in the family Alphaflexiviridae. Plants, specifically ryegrass, serve as natural hosts. There is only one species in this genus: Lolium latent virus.

Structure
Viruses in Lolavirus are non-enveloped, with flexuous and filamentous geometries. The diameter is around 13 nm, with a length of 640 nm. Genomes are linear, around 7.6kb in length, with five open reading frames that encode the replication-associated protein, the movement-associated triple gene block proteins, and the coat protein (which is cleaved into two parts weighing about 28 and 33 kDa). The genome codes for 6 proteins.

Life cycle
Viral replication is cytoplasmic, and is lysogenic. Entry into the host cell is achieved by penetration into the host cell. Replication follows the positive stranded RNA virus replication model. Positive stranded RNA virus transcription is the method of transcription. The virus exits the host cell by tripartite non-tubule guided viral movement. Plants serve as the natural host.

References

External links
 Viralzone: Lolavirus
 ICTV

Alphaflexiviridae
Virus genera